Samsung Galaxy A21s is a mid-range Android smartphone designed, developed, marketed, and manufactured by Samsung Electronics as part of its Galaxy A series.

The A21s line consists of SM-A217F, SM-A217F/DS, SM-A217F/DSN, SM-A217M and SM-A217M/DS. Key upgrades over the previous model, the Samsung Galaxy A20s, include the new Exynos 850 chipset and an improved camera setup. It was announced and released in May 2020.

 No longer receiving OS updates according to Samsung officials https://www.samsung.com

 No longer receiving Security updates from Samsung. (Only receiving Google Play system updates only From Google).

Specifications

Hardware
The Galaxy A21s has a 6.5" PLS TFT LCD Infinity O display with HD+ 720 x 1600 resolution, 20:9 aspect ratio, ~270 ppi density. The phone itself measures  x  x  and weighs . The phone is powered by Exynos 850 (8 nm) SoC (System on a chip) with a octa-core (4x2.0 GHz Cortex-A55 & 4x2.0 GHz Cortex-A55) CPU and a Mali-G52 GPU. The phone comes with either 4GB or 6GB RAM as well as 64GB or 128GB internal storage, which can be expanded via a microSD card of up to 512GB. It comes with a non-removable 5000mAh lithium polymer battery which charges with a 15W Fast Charger. It also has a rear-mounted fingerprint sensor.

Cameras
The Samsung Galaxy A21s has a four camera setup arranged in an "L" shape located in the corner with a rectangular protrusion similar to that of the iPhone 11 and the Pixel 4. The array consists of a 48 MP wide angle camera, an 8 MP ultrawide camera, a 2 MP macro camera, and a 2 MP depth sensor. It also has a single 13 MP front facing camera, which sits in a small punch hole on the front of the screen. The rear facing cameras can record video up to 1080p in 30 fps. The front cameras can shoot 1080p at 30 fps.

Software
The Galaxy A21s originally came with Android 10 and One UI 2.5; the current version comes with Android 12 and One UI 4.1. The phone has Samsung Knox 3.7 for added system security.

History
The Samsung Galaxy A21s was announced and released in May 2020.

In August 2021, It was revealed that Samsung had sold over 10 million units of the Samsung Galaxy A21s

See also
Samsung Galaxy
Samsung Galaxy A series
Samsung Galaxy A21
Samsung Galaxy A51
Samsung Galaxy A71

References

Samsung Galaxy
Mobile phones introduced in 2020
Android (operating system) devices
Mobile phones with multiple rear cameras